The Chicago Gay Men's Chorus (CGMC) is a choral organization in Chicago, Illinois.  Founded in 1983 with 55 singers, the chorus currently consists of approximately 150 singing members and over 200 members in total.

History
The Chorus was organized in 1983 in response to an invitation to participate in the first National Gay and Lesbian Choral Festival, Come Out! And Sing Together (COAST).  The event was staged at New York City's Lincoln Center and featured 1,200 individuals from twelve choruses from across the United States.  The fifty-five singers from the Chicago Gay Men's Chorus representing the city of Chicago opened the festival.

After the festival, the Chorus joined choruses from nine other cities to form a musical organization known as Gay And Lesbian Association of Choruses.  As one of GALA's founding member groups, CGMC continues its affiliation with the organization and has performed at every music festival sponsored.

In the years since its debut performance, CGMC became a prominent member of Chicago's gay and lesbian community and in the city's arts community as a whole. In 2001, CGMC was inducted into the Chicago Gay and Lesbian Hall of Fame.  In 2006, CGMC joined the League of Chicago Theatres; the year also marked CGMC's twenty-fifth performance season. Throughout the history of CGMC, the chorus has been supported, in part, by grants from the Illinois Arts Council and by the Chicago City Arts Program.

Performances and music
CGMC has a regular yearly performance season that consists of a holiday show, and a spring show.  The music performed in these concerts ranges from classical to pop to modern music.  The Chorus also incorporates a wide range of performance styles into its concerts.  In addition to traditional choral material, the concerts often include dance, sets and costumes, and other elements frequently found in musical theater.

The spring concerts are often full-scale theatrical productions, frequently presented in a parodic manner. Past spring productions have included The Pirates of Penzance, The Wizard of Oz, The Mikado, and H.M.S. Pinafore.  
In 2006, the Chorus performed The Ten Commandments: The Musical, an original musical co-written by the group's Artistic Director, Patrick Sinozich, and a singing member, Bill Larkin.  The Chorus has also performed several musical reviews named after Sidetrack, a popular Chicago video nightclub, and based on the club's weekly show tunes video nights.

In addition to its regular performance season, the Chorus makes appearances for fundraising or community representation purposes.  In past years, CGMC has appeared at benefits such as Show of Concern presented by Marshall Field's, World of Chocolate presented by the AIDS Foundation of Chicago, and Jubilate! presented by Bonaventure House.

The Chorus has also appeared for organizations or at events such as the marriage equality bill signing (where they sang America The Beautiful at Governor Quinn's personal invitation), Choose Chicago kickoff, AIDS Walk Chicago, International Mr. Leather, the Chicago Gay and Lesbian Pride Parade, the Illinois Gay and Lesbian Rodeo Association, Pride Fest Chicago, and has proudly performed the national anthem several times at Wrigley Field in Chicago.  In addition, the Chorus has made various traveling outreach trips to local cities including Bloomington–Normal and Peoria, Illinois. In 2018, the Chorus joined Demi Lovato to perform "Tell Me You Love Me" and "Sorry (Not Sorry)" during her Tell Me You Love Me World Tour stop in Allstate Arena.

The Chorus has made out-of-town appearances in Portland, Oregon, Los Angeles, New Orleans, Detroit, Fort Lauderdale, Tampa, Milwaukee, New York City, Montreal, Kansas City, Indianapolis, Miami, and Denver.  The Chorus has also hosted Chicago appearances of choruses from some of these same cities, other nearby cities, and European cities such as Amsterdam in the Netherlands, London in the United Kingdom and Hamburg, Germany.

Performance History

† - Prepared as a main stage show but presented virtually. 
‡ - Virtual performance.

Membership

The Chorus membership is divided into singing members and auxiliary members. The majority of the members are gay men, but the Chorus has a written policy to welcome all persons to the group regardless of sex, race, creed, gender identity, or sexual orientation.

Singing members belong to one of the four singing sections; first- and second-tenor, baritone, and bass. Most of these voices are divided into upper and lower subsections.  To become a singing member of the Chorus, a prospective member must have a successful audition with the artistic director, and re-audition every two years.  Non-performing auxiliary members are individuals who are tasked with behind the scenes duties in support of the mission of the Chorus.

Each of the shows of the performance season has preparation period of approximately twelve to thirteen weeks; consisting of weekly three-hour rehearsals. In addition to the weekly rehearsals, there may be a number of sectional/full chorus/dance/solo rehearsals that take place during each preparation period, at the request/discretion of the artistic director.

All music is performed "off book" meaning all songs must be completely memorized.  With a few exceptions, nearly all run out performances are also performed with memorized music.  Run out performances may consist of pieces that the Chorus is working on for an upcoming concert, pieces performed at a recent concert, or selections from the permanent repertoire of the Chorus.

Organization
The Chicago Gay Men's Chorus is a volunteer non-profit organization.  Membership dues, ticket sales, performance fees, CD sales, and individual and corporate donations support the operation of the Chorus in addition to grants from the Illinois Arts Council, Art Works Fund, and the Chicago Department of Cultural Affairs' City Arts grant program.

The Artistic Director (AD) leads the artistic staff of the Chorus, which consists of Accompanists, Stage Manager, Choreographers, a music librarian, while the Executive Director oversees operations.  The Artistic Director, Executive Director, Stage Manager and Accompanists are paid positions while the others are volunteer positions filled by the Chorus membership.

The Chorus is governed by a Board of Directors, which is responsible for governing the strategic and fiscal operation of the Chorus, which is largely carried out by a system of committees. Members of the Board of Directors consist of members from the Chorus itself or from the general community, and candidates are selected by the Elections Committee. The Board of Directors is led by an Executive Committee made up of the Board President, Vice President, Secretary, and Treasurer.

The Chorus also elects a Membership Council, which is responsible for the member experience including assisting the AD with rehearsal, retention and recruitment of Chorus members, organizing auditions, tracking attendance and member communications.  Members of the Membership Council are elected from active singing members of the Chorus, and candidates are selected by the Elections Committee.  Upon election, the council selects a Council President and representatives for each singing section of the Chorus.

The operational committees of the Chorus include four standing committees and a number of subcommittees with members appointed by the Executive Director or Board of Directors. The four standing committees are Finance, Fundraising, Performance, and Marketing.

Recordings
In November 2001, the Chorus released its first CD entitled Cool Yule, featuring holiday music with jazz-inspired arrangements.  The group's second CD, I Will Be Loved Tonight, was released in December 2004 and is a collection of songs dealing with relationships and love.  In 2006, the Chorus released its first collection of live recordings, Favorite Things, with live concert performances of holiday songs popular with the group's audiences. In December 2012, CGMC released Here We Come A-Caroling, featuring holiday songs from years past. In June 2013 a fifth CD, So Happy Together: Festival Gems was released containing recordings from the last three GALA Festival performances.

References

External links 
 Chicago Gay Men's Chorus Official website
 GALA Choruses Official website
 CGMC History

Choirs in Illinois
Musical groups from Chicago
Musical groups established in 1983
Gay men's choruses
GALA choruses
LGBT culture in Chicago
1983 establishments in Illinois
Gay culture in Illinois